Howell Mountain (formerly, White Cottage) is an unincorporated community in the Vaca Mountains, within Napa County, California. It lies at an elevation of 1683 feet (513 m).

History

Geography

For census purposes, it forms part of the Angwin census-designated place.

References

Unincorporated communities in Napa County, California
Vaca Mountains
Unincorporated communities in California